Dichomeris vernariella is a moth in the family Gelechiidae. It was described by Oleksiy V. Bidzilya in 1998. It is found in the Russian Far East.

References

Moths described in 1998
vernariella